Chlorophetanol is an antifungal.

References 

Antifungals
Chloroarenes
Phenol ethers
Primary alcohols